The 2016 Jordan FA Shield was the 31st Jordan FA Shield to be played. All 12 teams of the 2016-17 Jordan Premier League played in this competition.

The teams divided in two groups. The top two teams from each group qualified for the semifinals. Shabab Al-Ordon became the champions as they beat Al-Faisaly 5-1.

Group stage

Group A

Group B

Semi-finals

Final

References

External links
 درع المناصير الأردني 
 درع الاتحاد 16/17 | نادي الوحدات

Jordan Shield Cup
Shield